The Joseph R. Bowles House is a house located in southwest Portland, Oregon, that is listed on the National Register of Historic Places.

The Bowles house is a 4,959 sq. ft. two-story reinforced concrete building with Spanish tile roof and Italian marble columns. The house is an example of 1920s craftsmanship wherein expense was no barrier.

See also
 National Register of Historic Places listings in Southwest Portland, Oregon

References

External links

1922 establishments in Oregon
A. E. Doyle buildings
Houses completed in 1922
Houses on the National Register of Historic Places in Portland, Oregon
Italian Renaissance Revival architecture in the United States
Southwest Hills, Portland, Oregon
Portland Historic Landmarks